Agatha Egbudike (born 20 February 1985) is a Nigerian weightlifter.

She competed at the 2007 World Weightlifting Championships. and 2008 African Weightlifting Championships, winning a silver medal.

References 

Nigerian female weightlifters
Living people

1985 births
Place of birth missing (living people)
20th-century Nigerian women
21st-century Nigerian women